Sunnyland is a census-designated place (CDP) in Will County, Illinois, United States. It is in the northwest part of the county and is bordered to the west by Joliet and to the south and east by Crest Hill. It sits on the north side of U.S. Route 30, which leads southeast  to downtown Joliet and northwest  to Interstate 55.

Sunnyland was first listed as a CDP prior to the 2020 census.

Demographics

References 

Census-designated places in Will County, Illinois
Census-designated places in Illinois